Eugene Roy Cater (December 8, 1923January 15, 1990) was a Michigan politician.

Early life and education
Cater was born on December 8, 1923, in St. Joseph, Missouri. Cater was of Danish ancestry. Cater was a graduate of Ludington High School.

Military career
Cater served in the United States Army during World War II. Cater then served as a United States Coast Guard Auxiliary. Cater was a member of the National Order of the Trench Rats and the Disabled American Veterans.

Career

Cater owned and operated a laundry in Ludington, Michigan. On November 4, 1964, Cater was elected to the Michigan House of Representatives, where he represented the 98th district from January 1, 1965, to January 1, 1967. In May 1965, Cater, along with Republican Stanley M. Powell, introduced House Bill 2297, which sought to make the Petoskey stone Michigan's state stone. The bill was passed by the state house on May 19, 1965. On June 28, 1965, the bill was signed by Michigan Governor George W. Romney during a ceremony which was attended by Cater and Powell. During the ceremony, Cater presented Governor Romney with a tie clasp and cufflink set made of Petoskey stones.

In 1975, Cater moved from Ludington to Palmetto, Florida.

Personal life
In 1948, Cater married Donna Mae Fenner. Together, they had one child. Cater later married Leota, and had three stepchildren. Cater was a member of the Elks, the Fraternal Order of Eagles, and the American Legion. Cater was also a Freemason. Cater was Lutheran.

Death
Cater died on January 15, 1990, in Manatee Memorial Hospital in Bradenton, Florida. He was interred at Lakeview Cemetery in Ludington, Michigan.

References

1923 births
1990 deaths
American Freemasons
American Lutherans
American people of Danish descent
Burials in Michigan
Democratic Party members of the Michigan House of Representatives
Military personnel from Michigan
People from Ludington, Michigan
People from Palmetto, Florida
Politicians from St. Joseph, Missouri
United States Army personnel of World War II
20th-century American politicians
20th-century Lutherans
United States Coast Guard auxiliarists